Northern Secondary School (often referred to as Northern Secondary, Northern, or NSS) is a public high school in Toronto, Ontario, Canada. It teaches grades 9 through 12. It is a part of the Toronto District School Board (TDSB). Prior to Amalgamation of Toronto in 1998, it was within the Toronto Board of Education (TBE). The closest TTC subway station is Eglinton.

Northern has long-standing rivalries with nearby high-school North Toronto Collegiate Institute and also with Central Technical School, Lawrence Park Collegiate Institute, York Mills Collegiate Institute and Leaside High School.

History
Founded in 1930, it was originally known as Northern Vocational School, until the twenty-fifth anniversary when the name was changed to Northern Technical-Commercial, which lasted for three years until the present name, Northern Secondary School, came into use because a definite district had been assigned for matriculation students.

Northern was the first Ontario school to have a student council. The school is a pilot site of a Toronto Police Service program that places on-duty police officers in schools.

On May 13, 2016 it was alleged that a bomb was planted on the premises and the school was shut down to investigate. No explosive devices were found.

Along with all other public schools in Ontario, Northern Secondary was closed for in-person learning at various points during the COVID-19 pandemic.

Architecture
Northern Secondary is built in the Collegiate Gothic style, has a floor space of about 121,317 square feet and contains one hundred and fifteen rooms. C.E.C. Dyson was the school's original architect. Although little is known about him, he was the school board's architect from 1921 until 1949. Northern is known for the grotesques which exist on the exterior, throughout the entrance foyer and inside the auditorium.

Further evidence of the Gothic Collegiate style can be found in the vaulted ceilings of the hallways, and the arched doorways and windows featured throughout the building. As stated on a plaque inside the main entrance, during the 60s a major addition was built which significantly altered the rear of the school. These renovations changed little about the original parts of the building. Although once grand, over the decades, the facility has fallen into considerable disrepair and is in need of extensive renovation.

Academics
Northern's gifted program / enriched program and its comprehensive range of elective courses, including a diverse art department, bring students in from across the city. The school runs a selective admissions process, as well as optional attendance lotteries. There is a large variety of gifted courses available at all grade levels and AP courses available at the grade 11 and 12 levels.

Each year, Northern's students obtain over $1 million in university scholarships.

Northern's students have won numerous national & international awards in multiple academic disciplines. These include the NASA space settlement competition, the World Debates at Oxford, England, and the Canadian Association of Physicists national contest. Northern debaters are also the current reigning OSDU provincial debate championships.

The school has over 50 active clubs, associations and committees, as well as over 120 teachers, resulting in a 15 to 1 student teacher ratio.

Over 25% of the school’s students have special learning needs and therefore are on an individual education plan.

Sports
The school has over 50 varsity athletic teams. Northern's football team, the Red Knights, have won numerous titles in Toronto's high school league (including two Metro Bowls, and the first Toronto Bowl).  A number of top players have gone on to join the Canadian Football League.

Numerous alumni of the school have also gone on to play in the National Hockey League, the Greek Basket League, Major League Soccer, the Israeli Premier League, the as well as the Rugby World Cup.

In popular culture
The school has been used as a location for several films including Carrie (2013 film), as well as Jarvis Collegiate Institute, and Resident Evil: Apocalypse, which were filmed inside the school. The academic decathlon scene of Billy Madison was filmed in the school's auditorium. The 2009 documentary Fight for the Planet was also filmed at the school.

Numerous commercials have also been filmed on the school's premises.

Charity
Northern has a long history of supporting national & international charities, with over 40 years of participation in the United Way fundraisers for poverty alleviation. The school has been the top fundraiser amongst Toronto high schools for a number of years.

Notable alumni and staff

Alumni of the school include one Academy Award winner, a member of the Rock and Roll Hall of Fame, holders of the Order of Canada, as well as Grey Cup and Stanley Cup champions, a Spitfire pilot who played a key role in an escape from a German prison camp by Allied airmen which is remembered today as "The Great Escape", and a prominent Hebrew Bible scholar. Painter Lawren P. Harris taught at then Northern Vocational.

See also

List of secondary schools in Ontario

References

External links
Northern Secondary School
Northern Secondary School at the Toronto District School Board

Educational institutions established in 1930
High schools in Toronto
Schools in the TDSB
Gifted education
1930 establishments in Ontario